The 1969 Wales rugby union tour was a series of rugby union games undertaken by the Wales national rugby union team to Australia, Fiji and New Zealand. The tour took in four matches against regional and invitational teams and three tests; two to New Zealand and one to Australia. This was the second official Wales tour to the southern hemisphere and the first to Australasia and Melanesia.

The tour results were mixed for Wales; the team was unbeaten in the non-test matches and were victorious over Australia, but were completely out-classed by New Zealand. The captaincy of the tour was given to Newport's Brian Price.

Results

Touring party

Manager: D. J. Phillips

Full-backs
 J.P.R. Williams (London Welsh)

Three-quarters
 Gerald Davies (Cardiff)
 Maurice Richards (Cardiff)
 Keith Jarrett (Newport)
 John Dawes (London Welsh)
 Alan Skirving (Newport)
 Stuart Watkins (Newport)

Half-backs
 Phil Bennett (Llanelli)
 Gareth Edwards (Cardiff)
 Chico Hopkins (Maesteg)
 Barry John (Cardiff)

Forwards
 Mervyn Davies (London Welsh)
 Norman Gale (Llanelli)
 Dennis Hughes (Newbridge)
 Barry Llewellyn (Newport)
 David Lloyd (Bridgend)
 Dai Morris (Neath)
 Brian Price (Newport) (captain)
 John Taylor (London Welsh)
 Brian Thomas (Neath)
 Delme Thomas (Neath)
 Denzil Williams (Ebbw Vale)
 Jeff Young (Harrogate)

Replacements
 Vic Perrins (Newport)

Bibliography
 
 

1969 rugby union tours
1969 in Australian rugby union
1969 in New Zealand rugby union
1969
1969
1969
1969
1968–69 in Welsh rugby union
1969 in Fijian rugby union
History of rugby union matches between Australia and Wales
History of rugby union matches between New Zealand and Wales